Harvard Business School (HBS) is the graduate business school of Harvard University, a private research university in Boston, Massachusetts. It is consistently ranked among the top business schools in the world and offers a large full-time MBA program, management-related doctoral programs, and executive education programs. It owns Harvard Business Publishing, which publishes business books, leadership articles, case studies, and Harvard Business Review, a monthly academic business magazine. It is also home to the Baker Library/Bloomberg Center, the school's primary library.

History 

The school was established in 1908. Initially established by the humanities faculty, it received independent status in 1910, and became a separate administrative unit in 1913. The first dean was historian Edwin Francis Gay (1867–1946). Yogev (2001) explains the original concept:
This school of business and public administration was originally conceived as a school for diplomacy and government service on the model of the French Ecole des Sciences Politiques. The goal was an institution of higher learning that would offer a Master of Arts degree in the humanities field, with a major in business. In discussions about the curriculum, the suggestion was made to concentrate on specific business topics such as banking, railroads, and so on... Professor Lowell said the school would train qualified public administrators whom the government would have no choice but to employ, thereby building a better public administration... Harvard was blazing a new trail by educating young people for a career in business, just as its medical school trained doctors and its law faculty trained lawyers.

The business school pioneered the development of the case method of teaching, drawing inspiration from this approach to legal education at Harvard. Cases are typically descriptions of real events in organizations. Students are positioned as managers and are presented with problems which they need to analyze and provide recommendations on.

From the start the school enjoyed a close relationship with the corporate world. Within a few years of its founding many business leaders were its alumni and were hiring other alumni for starting positions in their firms.

At its founding, the school accepted only male students. The Training Course in Personnel Administration, founded at Radcliffe College in 1937, was the beginning of business training for women at Harvard. HBS took over administration of that program from Radcliffe in 1954. In 1959, alumnae of the one-year program (by then known as the Harvard-Radcliffe Program in Business Administration) were permitted to apply to join the HBS MBA program as second-years. In December 1962, the faculty voted to allow women to enter the MBA program directly. The first women to apply directly to the MBA program matriculated in September 1963.

In 2012–2013, HBS administration implemented new programs and practices to improve the experience of female students and recruit more female professors.

International research centers 
HBS established nine global research centers and four regional offices and functions through offices in Asia Pacific (Hong Kong, Shanghai, Singapore), United States (San Francisco Bay Area, CA), Europe (Paris, opened in 2003), South Asia (India), Middle East and North Africa (Dubai, Istanbul, Tel Aviv), Japan and Latin America (Buenos Aires, Mexico City, São Paulo).

Rankings

As of 2022, HBS is ranked fifth in the nation by U.S. News & World Report, third in the world by the Financial Times, and second in the world by QS World University Rankings.

Student life
HBS students can join more than 80 different clubs and student organizations on campus. The Student Association (SA) is the main interface between the MBA student body and the faculty/administration. In addition, the HBS student body is represented at the university level by the Harvard Graduate Council.

Executive education
In 2015, executive education contributed $168 million to HBS's total revenue of $707 million. This includes:

 The Advanced Management Program, a seven-week residential program for senior executives with the stated aim to "Prepare for the Highest Level of Leadership".
 The General Management Program, a four-month intensive residential program for senior executives who are general managers or within range of such position in their organizations.
 The Owner/President Management Program, three three-week "units" spread over two years that is marketed to "business owners and entrepreneurs".
 Harvard Business School Online, launched in 2014 as HBX, offers flexible certificate and credential programs taught by Harvard Business School faculty and delivered via an online platform.
 The Summer Venture in Management Program, a one-week management training program for rising college seniors designed to increase diversity and opportunity in business education. Participants must be employed in a summer internship and be nominated by and have sponsorship from their organization to attend.

Academic units 
The school's faculty are divided into 10 academic units: Accounting and Management; Business, Government and the International Economy; Entrepreneurial Management; Finance; General Management; Marketing; Negotiation, Organizations & Markets; Organizational Behavior; Strategy; and Technology and Operations Management.

Buildings 
Older buildings include the 1927-built Morgan Hall, named for J.P. Morgan, and 1940-built Loeb house, named for John L. Loeb Sr. and his son, (both designed by McKim, Mead & White), and the 1971-built Burden Hall with a 900-seat auditorium.

In the fall of 2010, Tata related companies and charities donated $50 million for the construction of an executive center. The executive center was named as Tata Hall, after Ratan Tata (AMP, 1975), the chairman of Tata Sons. The total construction costs have been estimated at $100 million. Tata Hall is located in the northeast corner of the HBS campus. The facility is devoted to the Harvard Business School's Executive Education programs. At seven stories tall with about 150,000 gross square feet, it contains about 180 bedrooms for education students, in addition to academic and multi-purpose spaces.

Kresge Way was located by the base of the former Kresge Hall, and is named for Sebastian S. Kresge. In 2014, Kresge Hall was replaced by a new hall that was funded by a US$30 million donation by the family of the late Ruth Mulan Chu Chao, whose four daughters all attended Harvard Business School. The Executive Education quad currently includes McArthur, Baker, and Mellon Halls (residences), McCollum and Hawes (classrooms), Chao Center, and Glass (administration).

Notable alumni

MBA 

Paul V. Applegarth, 1974 – first CEO of the Millennium Challenge Corporation and executive with World Bank, Bank of America, and American Express
Bill Ackman, 1992 – hedge fund manager
Joseph L. Badaracco – senior associate dean, chair, and professor of business ethics, HBS MBA program; author
Rahul Bajaj, 1964 – CEO of Bajaj Auto
Raymond W. Baker, 1960 – director of Global Financial Integrity
Jim Balsillie, 1989 – billionaire co-CEO of Research In Motion
Steve Bannon – former White House advisor and former chairman of Breitbart News Network
Alex Behring – co-founder and managing partner of 3G Capital
Tarek Ben Halim – investment banker and founder of Alfanar, a venture philanthropy organization
Guy Berruyer – French CEO of Sage Group
Ernesto Bertarelli The Italian-born Swiss billionaire businessman and philanthropist.
Len Blavatnik, 1989 – Ukrainian-American businessman
Michael Bloomberg, 1966 – former mayor of New York City
Dan Bricklin, 1979 – inventor of the electronic spreadsheet
Tracy Britt Cool, 2009 – entrepreneur; former director of Berkshire Hathaway and subsidiaries
Jane Buchan CEO of Martlet Asset Management
Charles Bunch, 1979 – CEO of PPG Industries
Jean Burelle (born 1938/39) – French billionaire chairman and CEO of Burelle
Steve Burke – NBCUniversal CEO; Comcast executive vice president
George W. Bush, 1975 – 43rd President of the United States and former Governor of Texas
Liam Byrne, 2010 – politician, British Labour Party Member of parliament
Philip Caldwell, 1942 – chairman and CEO of the Ford Motor Company
Chase Carey, 1980 – president of News Corporation
Cynthia Carroll, 1989 – former CEO of Anglo American PLC
Donald J. Carty, 1971 – chairman and CEO of American Airlines
Elaine Chao, 1979 – U.S. Secretary of Transportation and former U.S. Secretary of Labor
P. Chidambaram, 1968 – former Union Minister of Finance in India
Teresa Clarke – former managing director of Goldman Sachs (2004–2010) and CEO and founder of Africa.com
Vittorio Colao, 1990 – CEO of Vodafone Group
Sherry Coutu, 1993 – former CEO and angel investor
Stephen Covey, 1957 – self-help author
Zoe Cruz, 1982 – banker; former co-president of Morgan Stanley
Philip Hart Cullom, 1988 – U.S. Navy Vice Admiral
John D'Agostino, 2002 – managing director of Alkeon Capital and subject of best-selling book Rigged: The True Story of a Wall Street Novice who Changed the World of Oil Forever
Daniel A. D'Aniello, 1974 – co-founder of The Carlyle Group
Ray Dalio, 1973 – founded Bridgewater Associates
Jeffrey Deitch, 1978 – art dealer and gallerist
Elisabeth DeMarse, 1980 – CEO of Newser
Anne Dias-Griffin, 1997 – hedge fund manager for Aragon Global Management
Betty Jane Diener, 1964 (and DBA, 1974) – Virginia Secretary of Commerce (1982–1986)
Jamie Dimon, 1982 – CEO and chairman of JPMorgan Chase
James Dinan, 1985 – founder of hedge fund York Capital Management
Tim Draper, 1984 – venture capital investor
Colin Drummond – CEO of Viridor and joint CEO of Pennon Group
Donna Dubinsky, 1981 – CEO of Palm, Inc.
Axel Dumas, 2010 – CEO of Hermès
Erik Engstrom, 2015 – CEO of Reed Elsevier
Mary Callahan Erdoes, 1993 – CEO of J.P. Morgan Asset Management
Sheldon Erikson, 1970 – chairman, president and CEO of Cameron International Corporation
Diana Farrell 1991 – president and CEO of JPMorgan Chase Institute
Nicholas Ferguson – chairman of BskyB
Trevor Fetter, 1986 – Senior Lecturer at HBS; former CEO of Tenet Healthcare
Mark Fields, 1989 – president and CEO of Ford Motor Company
Barbara Hackman Franklin, 1964 – 29th U.S. Secretary of Commerce
Jane Fraser 1994 – CEO of Citigroup
Morten Friis 1979 – Chief Risk Officer of Royal Bank of Canada
Gregory Gray Garland Jr., 1949 – lawyer and business executive; chairman of the Pittsburgh and Lake Erie Railroad
William W. George – senior fellow and professor, HBS MBA program; author; former chair and CEO of Medtronic
Brad Gerstner, 2000 – Founder of Altimeter Capital
Shikhar Ghosh, 1980 – entrepreneur, lecturer at HBS
Melvin Gordon, 1943 – CEO of Tootsie Roll Industries (1962–2015)
Allan Gray, 1965 – founder of Allan Gray Investment Management and philanthropist
John Grayken – billionaire founder of Lone Star Funds
C. Scott Green, 1989 – president of the University of Idaho
Ranjay Gulati – professor, HBS MBA program, author
Rajat Gupta, 1973 – former managing director of McKinsey & Company; convicted of insider trading in the 2011 Galleon Group case
Walter A. Haas Jr., 1939 – CEO of Levi Strauss & Co.
Ken Hakuta, 1977 – entrepreneur and inventor
Dido Harding a British Conservative Party businesswoman serving as chairwoman of NHS Improvement since 2017
Fred Hassan, 1972 – CEO of Schering-Plough
Frances Haugen, 2011 – data engineer and Facebook whistleblower
Rodney A. Hawes Jr., 1969 – CEO of LifeRe and benefactor of the Hawes Hall classroom building
Randy Haykin, 1988 – founder of The Intersection Event and The Gratitude Network
Fritz Henderson, 1984 – former president and CEO of General Motors
John B. Hess, 1977 – CEO of Hess Corporation
Andy Hill, 1990 – politician, Washington State Senator
Douglas Hodge, 1984 – CEO of PIMCO, charged with fraud for allegedly participating in the 2019 college admissions bribery scandal
Chris Hohn, 1993 – British activist investor, billionaire, philanthropist, founder of The Children's Investment Fund Foundation
Yoshito Hori, 1991 – founder of Globis University Graduate School of Management
Darren Huston, 1994 – CEO of Priceline
Jennifer Hyman, 2009 – Co-founder and CEO of Rent the Runway
Jeff Immelt, 1982 – former chairman and CEO of General Electric
Andy Jassy, 1997 – CEO, Amazon
Abigail Johnson, 1988 – chairman of Fidelity Investments
Ron Johnson, 1984 – former CEO of J. C. Penney
Henry Juszkiewicz, 1979 – CEO of Gibson Guitars Inc.
George Kaiser, 1966 – chairman of BOK Financial Corporation
Steven Kandarian – CEO of Metlife Group
Salman Khan, 2003 – founder of Khan Academy
Naina Lal Kidwai, 1982 – Group General Manager and Country Head of HSBC India
Seth Klarman – billionaire hedge fund manager; Baupost Group founder
Jim Koch, 1978 – co-founder and chairman of the Boston Beer Company
Robert Kraft, 1965 – chairman and CEO of The Kraft Group, owner of the New England Patriots and New England Revolution
Larry S. Kramer, 1974 – founder and CEO of Marketwatch, president and publisher of USA Today
A.G. Lafley, 1977 – former CEO and chairman of the board of Procter & Gamble
Stephen D. Lebovitz, 1988 – CEO of CBL & Associates Properties
Kewsong Lee, 1990 – CEO of The Carlyle Group.
William Legge, 10th Earl of Dartmouth – UKIP Member of the European Parliament
Michael Lynton, 1987 – chairman and CEO of Sony Pictures Entertainment
William MacDonald, 1940 – Christian preacher and writer in the Plymouth Brethren movement
Anand Mahindra, 1981 – owner and chairman of Mahindra Group
Nadiem Makarim, 2011 – co-founder and former CEO of Gojek, Minister of Education and Culture of Indonesia
Stephen Mandel – billionaire hedge fund manager; Lone Pine Capital founder
Lawrence Marcus, 1940 – Vice-president of Neiman Marcus
Prince Maximilian of Liechtenstein, 1998 – president and CEO of LGT Group
Tom McGrath – chairman of Broadway Across America, Broadway and film producer
Robert McNamara, 1939 – former Secretary of Defense; former president of World Bank
W. James McNerney Jr., 1975 – CEO of Boeing
Richard Menschel, 1959 – (retired) senior director of Goldman Sachs; 2015 winner of the Carnegie Medal of Philanthropy.
Christopher Michel, 1998 – founder and former CEO of Military.com, and founder and former CEO Affinity Labs
Hiroshi Mikitani Founder and CEO of Rakuten
Karen Mills, 1977 – 23rd Administrator of the Small Business Administration
Ann S. Moore, 1978 – CEO of Time Inc.
David Nelms, 1987 – CEO of Discover Financial Services
Grover Norquist, 1981 – president of Americans for Tax Reform
Mark Okerstrom, 2004 President/CEO of Expedia Group
Neil Pasricha, 2007 – author and speaker
Henry Paulson, 1970 – former U.S. Secretary of the Treasury, former CEO of Goldman Sachs
John Paulson – president of Paulson & Co., a New York-based hedge fund
Art Peck, 1979 – CEO of GAP, Inc.
Joseph R. Perella, 1972 – founder and CEO of Wasserstein Perella & Co. and Perella Weinberg Partners
Chip Perry, 1980 – former president and CEO of TrueCar; first employee and CEO of AutoTrader.com
Carl Howard Pforzheimer Jr (1907–1996), 1930 – investment banker
Mark Pincus – CEO of Zynga
Michael B. Polk – CEO of Newell Brands
Bruce Rauner, 1981 – 42nd Governor of Illinois
Edwin W. Rawlings, 1939 – U.S. Air Force and president and chairman of General Mills
James Reed, 1990 – chairman and chief executive of the Reed group of companies
John Replogle former CEO of Seventh Generation Inc.
Gary Rodkin, 1979 – CEO and president of ConAgra Foods
Horacio Rodriguez Larreta, 1992 – Mayor of Buenos Aires
Mitt Romney, 1975 – 70th Governor of Massachusetts, co-founder of Bain Capital and 2012 presidential nominee of the Republican Party
Wilbur Ross, 1961 – Secretary of Commerce (2017–2021) under the Trump Administration
Sheryl Sandberg, 1995 – COO of Facebook
Ann Sarnoff, 1987 – president of BBC America
Ulf Mark Schneider, 1993 – CEO of Nestlé, and former CEO of Fresenius
Stephen A. Schwarzman, 1972 – founder of Blackstone Group
Joe Shoen, 1973 – billionaire chairman of AMERCO
Martin A. Siegel, 1971 — former Kidder, Peabody & Co. investment banker and former Drexel Burnham Lambert managing director; convicted for insider trading in 1987
Jayant Sinha 1992 – Union Minister of State for Finance of India
Chatri Sityodtong, 1999 – chairman and CEO of ONE Championship
Jeffrey Skilling, 1979 – former CEO of Enron; convicted of securities fraud and insider trading
Tad Smith – CEO of Sotheby's
Gunnar Sønsteby, 1947 – Norwegian World War Two resistance fighter, most highly decorated person of Norway
Guy Spier, 1993 – author and investor
E. Roe Stamps 1974 – founding partner of private equity firm Summit Partners
Gerald L. Storch – chairman and CEO of Toys "R" Us, Inc.
Sandra Sucher – businesswoman; professor, HBS MBA program
Anjali Sud, 2011 – CEO of Vimeo
Anthony Tan, 2011 – co-founder and CEO of Grab
Tan Hooi Ling, 2011 – co-founder and CEO of Grab
John Thain, 1979 – former CEO of Merrill Lynch
Pamela Thomas-Graham, 1988 – businesswoman Clorox, Credit Suisse, and Liz Claiborne, author
Gerald Tremblay, 1972 – mayor of Montreal and former Quebec's Minister of Industry, Commerce, Science and Technology
Melvin T. Tukman, 1966 – co-founder and president of Tukman Grossman Capital Management
David Viniar, 1980 – CFO and executive vice president of Goldman Sachs
Rick Wagoner, 1977 – former CEO of General Motors
Wendell Weeks, 1987 – chairman, CEO and president of Corning Inc.
John C. Whitehead, 1947 – former co-chairman of Goldman Sachs
Meg Whitman, 1979 – president and CEO of Hewlett-Packard
Glenn Youngkin, 1994 – Governor of Virginia; former co-CEO of The Carlyle Group
Michelle Zatlyn, 2009 – co-founder, president, and COO of Cloudflare

DBA 
Jay Lorsch, DBA, 1964 – professor, HBS MBA program; contingency theory contributor; author, DBA (1964)
George Schussel, DBA, 1966 – founder and former chairman of Digital Consulting Institute and founder of Jellicle Investors, Inc.
Robert B. Stobaugh, DBA, 1968 – Harvard Business School emeritus professor of Business Administration

Executive Education

Advanced Management Program (AMP) 
Timothy I. Ahern, 1967 – U.S. Air Force Major General
Gabi Ashkenazi, AMP, 2004 – Chief of the General Staff of Israel Defense Forces
Jaime Zobel de Ayala, 1963 – Filipino businessman and chairman emeritus of Ayala Corporation
Julie Bishop, AMP, 1996 – Australian deputy Prime Minister
Rick Burr, 2013 – Chief of the Australian Army
Alden W. Clausen, 1966 – World Bank Former President
Christine M. Day, 2002 – Canadian business executive and former CEO of Lululemon
Y. C. Deveshwar – chairman and CEO of ITC Limited
Muhammad bin Ibrahim, 2010 – 8th Governor of Central Bank of Malaysia
Antony Leung, 1999 – financial secretary of Hong Kong
William Lewis, 2009 – Journalist, British Media Executive
Minoru Makihara, 1977 – Senior Corporate Advisor, Former Chairman, President & Chief Executive Officer, Mitsubishi Corporation
Christopher McCormick – president and CEO of L.L. Bean
David V. Miller – U.S. Air Force Major General
Michael Mullen, 1991 – Chairman of the Joint Chiefs of Staff, United States armed forces
A. Sivathanu Pillai, 1991 – honorary distinguished professor of Indian Space Research Organisation
Matthew Barrett (banker), 1981 – Former Chairman and CEO, Bank of Montreal; chairman and Chief Executive, Barclays Bank
Ajay Piramal, 1992 – chairman, Piramal Group
Brian J Porter, President and chief executive officer, Scotiabank
Ratan Tata, 1975 – chairman and CEO Tata Sons
Lucius Theus, AMP 57 – Major General in the United States Air Force
Jim Lovell, 1971 – Astronaut, Apollo 13

Other executive education 

Paolo Rocca, 1985 – CEO of Techint
Aigboje Aig-Imoukhuede, 2000 – co-founder Access Bank Plc and founder and chairman, Africa Initiative for Governance
Ciara – American singer
Vicente Fox – 55th President of Mexico
Kilma S. Lattin – Emmy Award-winning Native American leader, military veteran, and business man
Jason Tanamor – Filipino-American author
Daniel Vasella, PMD, 1989 – president of Novartis AG
Howard Zuker also known as Zack Norman, 2005 (OPM 34) – financier, producer and actor

Case studies 
 
Pandesic

See also 
 :Category:Harvard Business School alumni
 List of Harvard University people
 List of Ivy League business schools
 Spangler Center

References

Further reading 
Anteby, Michel. Manufacturing Morals: The Values of Silence in Business School Education. (University of Chicago Press, 2013), a faculty view
Bridgman, T., Cummings, S & McLaughlin, C. (2016). Re-stating the case: How revisiting the development of the case method can help us think differently about the future of the business school. Academy of Management Learning and Education, 15(4): 724–741
Broughton, P.D. Ahead of the Curve: Two Years at the Harvard Business School. (Penguin Press, 2008), a memoir
Cohen, Peter. The gospel according to the Harvard Business School. (Doubleday, 1973)
Copeland, Melvin T. And Mark an Era: The Story of the Harvard Business School (1958)
Cruikshank, Jeffrey. Shaping The Waves: A History Of Entrepreneurship At Harvard Business School . (Harvard Business Review Press, 2005)

Smith, Robert M. The American Business System: The Theory and Practice of Social Science, the Case of the Harvard Business School, 1920–1945 (Garland Publishers, 1986)
Yogev, Esther. "Corporate Hand in Academic Glove: The New Management's Struggle for Academic Recognition—The Case of the Harvard Group in the 1920s," American Studies International (2001) 39#1 online

External links 

Harvard Business School
1908 establishments in Massachusetts
Business School
Robert A. M. Stern buildings
Satellite campuses